is a former Japanese football player.

Playing career
Kitajima was born in Joso on October 29, 1975. Through the Chinese club Guangdong Hongyuan, he joined the Japan Football League (JFL) club Oita Trinity in 1997. However he did not play in many matches. In 1998, he moved to the JFL club Mito HollyHock based in his local Ibaraki Prefecture. However he did not play in any matches. In 1999, he moved to the newly promoted J2 League club, Ventforet Kofu on loan. However he did not play much. In 2000, he returned to Mito HollyHock, which had just been promoted to J2. He became a regular player as a defensive midfielder and played often. In 2006, he moved to the J2 club Shonan Bellmare. He played often until 2007. However his opportunity to play decreased in 2008 and he retired at the end of the 2008 season.

Club statistics

References

External links

1975 births
Living people
Association football people from Ibaraki Prefecture
Japanese footballers
J2 League players
Japan Football League (1992–1998) players
Oita Trinita players
Mito HollyHock players
Ventforet Kofu players
Shonan Bellmare players
Japanese expatriate sportspeople in China
Expatriate footballers in China
Association football midfielders